Richard Allison may refer to:
Richard Allison (composer) (c. 1560/70–before 1610), English composer
Richard Allison (military physician) (1757–1816), Physician General of the U.S. Army
Richard Allison (architect) (1869–1958), Scottish architect
Rick Allison (born 1964), Belgian musician